Svarciella is a subgenus of flies belonging to the family Lesser Dung flies.

Species
M. amphicuspa Roháček & Marshall, 1988
M. archboldi Marshall, 1985
M. aterga Roháček & Marshall, 1988
M. bartaki Roháček, 2010
M. bipara Marshall, 1985
M. brachyptera Roháček & Marshall, 1988
M. concinna Roháček & Marshall, 1988
M. contrasta Marshall, 1985
M. cornigera Roháček & Marshall, 1988
M. dissimilicosta (Spuler, 1925)
M. egena Roháček, 1992
M. fanta Roháček & Marshall, 1988
M. flagrella Roháček & Marshall, 1988
M. floreni Roháček & Marshall, 1985
M. furculipexa Roháček & Marshall, 1988
M. furculisterna (Deeming, 1969)
M. guestphalica (Duda, 1918)
M. hastata Roháček & Marshall, 1988
M. intercepta Marshall, 1985
M. ismayi Roháček, 1983
M. niveipennis (Malloch, 1913)
M. pujadei Carles-Tolrá, 2001
M. puncticorpoides (Papp, 1973)
M. spinifera Roháček & Marshall, 1988
M. triplex Roháček & Marshall, 1988
M. unica (Papp, 1973)
M. v-atrum (Villeneuve, 1917)
M. vitripennis (Zetterstedt, 1847)
M. vixa Marshall, 1985
M. xanthosceles Roháček & Marshall, 1988
M. xestops Roháček & Marshall, 1988

References

Sphaeroceridae
Diptera of North America
Diptera of South America
Diptera of Europe
Insect subgenera